Wang Xibin (born February 1948) is a retired general in the Chinese People's Liberation Army (PLA). He served as president of the PLA National Defense University from 2007 to 2013.

Biography

Born in Ning'an, Heilongjiang province, Wang joined the PLA in January 1966. He graduated from the Academy of Armor Engineering, majoring in military command. He served as chief of staff of the 38th Group Army of the PLA. In December 2000, he became the commander of the 27th Group Army. In December 2005, he was promoted to chief of staff of the Beijing Military Region. In September 2007, he was appointed as president of the PLA National Defense University. He was made a lieutenant general in July 2007, and a full general in July 2010. He was a member of the 17th Central Committee of the Chinese Communist Party.

Downfall
In February 2017, it was announced that he was under investigation for corruption.

References

Living people
1948 births
People's Liberation Army generals from Heilongjiang
People from Mudanjiang
Members of the 17th Central Committee of the Chinese Communist Party
Expelled members of the Chinese Communist Party
People's Liberation Army generals convicted of corruption
Delegates to the 10th National People's Congress
Members of the Standing Committee of the 12th National People's Congress